The Dortsedor River is a river located along the Afienya-Dawhenya road in the Greater Accra Region of Ghana.

References 

Rivers of Ghana
Greater Accra Region